Humming is a 2008 South Korean romance drama film starring Lee Chun-hee and Han Ji-hye.

Plot
Joon-seo (Lee Chun-hee), a talented young scientist, is bored with his relationship with diving instructor Mi-yeon (Han Ji-hye) and plans to go on a research trip to Antarctica in order to get away for a while. But one day tragedy strikes, and Mi-yeon becomes comatose after an accident.

Cast
 Lee Chun-hee as Joon-seo 
 Han Ji-hye as Mi-yeon
 Jung Jae-jin as professor
 Park Choong-seon as bodyguard 
 Kim Cheol-heung as laundromat man 
 Son Eun-seo as veterinarian
 Lee Min-ki as Oh Chun-jae, Joon-seo's friend (cameo)
 Lee Hwi-hyang as Mi-yeon's aunt (cameo)

Box office
It drew 104,850 admissions, grossing .

References

External links 
  
 
 
 

2008 films
2000s Korean-language films
South Korean romantic drama films
2000s South Korean films